Shahid (also Romanized as Shahīd; also known as Shabīd and Shāhed) is a village in Dehram Rural District, Dehram District, Farashband County, Fars Province, Iran. At the 2006 census, its population was 321, in 71 families.

References 

Populated places in Farashband County